Lin Junmin (born 31 August 1996) is a Chinese sport shooter.

He participated at the 2018 ISSF World Shooting Championships, winning a medal.

He has qualified to represent China at the 2020 Summer Olympics.

References

External links

Living people
1996 births
Chinese male sport shooters
ISSF pistol shooters
Sport shooters from Zhejiang
Asian Games medalists in shooting
Asian Games silver medalists for China
Shooters at the 2018 Asian Games
Medalists at the 2018 Asian Games
Shooters at the 2020 Summer Olympics
21st-century Chinese people